This is a list of episodes for The Daily Show with Trevor Noah in 2022. This is the final year of The Daily Show to be hosted by Trevor Noah, whose final episode had aired on December 8, 2022.

On April 11, the show returned to its original studio and brought back its studio audience, after the COVID-19 pandemic cause the show to move to Noah's apartment and later at the ViacomCBS headquarters.

On September 29, 2022, Noah announced that he would resign by the end of the year. Noah’s final episode aired on December 8.

2022

January

February

March

April

May

June

July

August

September

October

November

December

References

 
Daily Show guests
Daily Show guests
Daily Show guests